Baodi North railway station is a railway station in Yuhua Subdistrict, Baodi District, Tianjin, China. It is an intermediate stop on the Tianjin–Jizhou railway and was opened in 1965. The station was originally named Baodi but was renamed Baodi North on 30 August 2022, before the opening of the new Baodi railway station in late 2022.

References 

Railway stations in Tianjin
Railway stations in China opened in 1965